Close to Us is a 1958 Soviet drama film directed by Adolf Bergunker.

Plot 
The engineer together with the journalist went to the plant in Altai after studying at the institute and are confident in their future. At the factory, they are faced with a turner Milovidov, over-fulfilling the plan, thanks to an artificially created situation. Friends decide to expose this person.

Cast 
 Leonid Bykov as Nikolay
 Innokenty Smoktunovsky as Andrey
 Klara Luchko as Antonina
 Georgi Yumatov as Yasha Mulovidov
 Nikolai Rybnikov as Chumov
 Nina Doroshina as Lyuba Zvonaryova
 Lyudmila Shagalova as Nina
 Boris Chirkov as Stletov
 Zinaida Sharko as Telegraph operator
 Vladislav Strzhelchik as Kovalyov
 Boris Arakelov as Yura
 Oleg Yefremov as Komsomol secretary
 Rimma Markova as  mother of many children (movie debut)
 Zinaida Sharko as telegraph operator

References

External links 
 

Soviet drama films
1958 drama films
1958 films
Lenfilm films
Soviet black-and-white films
1950s Russian-language films